Simon James Peterson (born 17 November 1968) is a New Zealand former cricketer. He played 26 first-class and 19 List A matches for Auckland from 1989 to 1997.

See also
 List of Auckland representative cricketers

References

External links
 

1968 births
Living people
New Zealand cricketers
Auckland cricketers
Cricketers from Auckland